Blera kyotoensis is a species of hoverfly in the family Syrphidae.

Distribution
Japan.

References

Eristalinae
Insects described in 1952
Diptera of Asia